Whiteford is a surname. Notable people with the surname include:

Andy Whiteford (born 1977), Scottish footballer and manager
Blackie Whiteford (1889–1962), American actor
Derek Whiteford (born 1947), Scottish footballer and manager
Doug Whiteford (died 1979), Australian racing driver
Eilidh Whiteford (born 1969), Scottish politician
Hugh C. Whiteford, American politician
Joseph S. Whiteford (politician) (born 1859), American politician
Kate Whiteford (born 1952), Scottish artist
Peter Whiteford (born 1980), Scottish golfer
Robert Whiteford, Scottish mixed martial artist
Samuel M. Whiteford (1809–1889), American politician
William M. Whiteford (died 1936), American politician

See also 

 Whitford (surname)

English-language surnames